WFW or WfW may refer to:

 Watford West railway station, a disused railway station in Watford, Hertfordshire (National Rail station code)
 Watson, Farley & Williams, a law firm based in London, UK
 Windows for Workgroups, an operating system developed by Microsoft
 Microsoft Word for Windows, a popular word-processing software
 The World of Fine Wine, a wine magazine